Katarzynów may refer to the following places:
Katarzynów, Łódź East County in Łódź Voivodeship (central Poland)
Katarzynów, Radomsko County in Łódź Voivodeship (central Poland)
Katarzynów, Zgierz County in Łódź Voivodeship (central Poland)
Katarzynów, Grójec County in Masovian Voivodeship (east-central Poland)
Katarzynów, Kozienice County in Masovian Voivodeship (east-central Poland)
Katarzynów, Lipsko County in Masovian Voivodeship (east-central Poland)